Sheryl James (born 11 February 1986) is a South African Paralympic athlete. She competes in 100, 200 and 400 metres sprinting events. She is a bronze medalist at the World Para Athletics Championships and also at the Summer Paralympics.

References

External links 
 

1986 births
Living people
Sportspeople from Pretoria
South African female sprinters
Paralympic athletes of South Africa
Paralympic bronze medalists for South Africa
Medalists at the World Para Athletics Championships
Athletes (track and field) at the 2020 Summer Paralympics
Medalists at the 2020 Summer Paralympics
Track and field athletes with cerebral palsy
20th-century South African women
21st-century South African women